Grand Boulevard is a beltway in Corona, California that was recognized by the National Register of Historic Places in 2011 as a part of the Grand Boulevard Historic District.

It is an ordinary surface street that circles the city's historic downtown area and is approximately half a mile from the city center. It is unusual for being perfectly circular. The street was designed by Hiram Clay Kellogg (In memory of him, there is a street in Corona named Kellogg Street). Grand Boulevard was home to international races in 1913, 1914 and 1916. Grand is easily accessible from the Main Street exit on California State Route 91.

References

Transportation in Corona, California
Streets in Riverside County, California
Beltways in the United States
Historic districts on the National Register of Historic Places in California
National Register of Historic Places in Riverside County, California
Roads on the National Register of Historic Places in California